Elegia (In English: Elegy; occasionally with the Finnish subtitle , or Sadness), Op. 4/1, is a composition for string orchestra by the Finnish composer Leevi Madetoja, who wrote the piece in 1909 during his student years. On 10 January 1910, Robert Kajanus, chief conductor of the Helsinki Orchestral Society, premiered the Elegia to great acclaim, with the piece described as the "first master work" of a budding "natural orchestral composer". Madetoja subsequently designated the Elegia as the first number in his four-movement Sinfoninen sarja (Symphonic Suite), Op. 4, which the Helsinki Orchestral Society performed in its entirety under the composer's baton on 26 September 1910. The suite's three other numbers are virtually unknown, and the Elegia typically is performed as a stand-alone concert piece. Stylistically reminiscent of Tchaikovsky, it is, to date, Madetoja's most recorded and well-known orchestral composition, as well as the most enduringly popular of his many miniatures.

History 

During his time at the Music Institute, Madetoja's first compositions premiered at various student concerts: in December 1908, the Op. 2 songs, Yksin and Lähdettyäs; and on 29 May 1909, the Piano Trio, Op. 1 (second and third movements only).

Even more significantly, in January 1910, Robert Kajanus, chief conductor of the Helsinki Orchestral Society, conducted the premiere of Madetoja's Elegia on 10 January 1910; the program featured the Third Symphony, Im Walde (In the Forest) of Swiss-German composer Joachim Raff (1869) . The critics received the Elegia enthusiastically, describing it as the "first master work" of a budding "natural orchestral composer".

Additional praise followed Madetoja's first composition concert in Helsinki on 26 September 1910, at which he conducted the Piano Trio, the Chess Suite, Op. 5 (excerpted from the incidental music Madetoja had composed for Eino Leino's play), and his new four-movement Symphonic Suite, Op. 4, for which he had decided to designate his Elegia as the first number. One such positive review, for example, came from the pen of Martin Wegelius, who wrote:

The positive reviews did, however, contain a note of concern; with Madetoja's plans to travel to Paris to resume his studies well known, one critic,  of Uusi Suometar, worried about the negative "influence French modern atonal composition" could have on "this fresh northern nature [Madetoja]".

Orchestration 
The instrumentation used for the Elegia is as follows: 
Strings: violins, violas, cellos, double basses

Each of the Symphonic Suite's remaining three numbers (Nos. 2–4) utilizes a full concert orchestra, including woodwinds, brass, percussion, and harp.

Structure 
The Symphonic Suite, of which the Elegia is a component number, is in four movements. The suite's three other numbers (Nos. 2–4) are virtually unknown, and the Elegia typically is performed as a stand-alone concert piece. The entire suite,  which is about 35 minutes in duration, contains the following movements:

Discography 
Thus far, only Nordic orchestras and ensembles have recorded the Elegia, which typically appears as the 'Madetoja entry' on compilation CDs of orchestral miniatures by various Finnish composers. On the other hand, Arvo Volmer and the Oulu Symphony Orchestra (1998–2006) and John Storgårds and the Helsinki Philharmonic Orchestra (2012–13) have each recorded the Elegia as a component piece of their larger recording projects of Madetoja's orchestral works. The world premiere (and to date only) recording of the complete four-movement Symphonic Suite is by Volmer and the Oulu Symphony Orchestra.

Overall, the critics have received the Elegia favorably. In his review of the Storgårds recording, the American Record Guide's Roger Hecht likens the Elegia to Sibelius's ubiquitous Valse triste or "some moody Tchaikovsky", describing the piece as "beautiful" and "heartfelt"; Guy Rickards, writing in Gramophone, also hears echoes of Valse triste. A number of contributors to the website MusicWeb International have also admired Madetoja's Elegia. Brian Reinhart, who reviews the Panula recording on one of the Naxos compilation discs, names the "gorgeous" Elegia as his "favorite new discovery from the whole set", praising Madetoja for his ability to write "formally precise and emotionally gripping music for string orchestra". Another contributor, John France, argues that the Elegia "should be much better known", nominating it as a "definite candidate for Classic FM" based upon its "beauty" and "restraint".

References and sources

References

Sources 

Books

CD liner notes

Journal articles
 
 

Websites

Suites by Leevi Madetoja
1909 compositions
Compositions for string orchestra